Marie of Orléans (19 December/September 1457 – 1493) was the elder sister of King Louis XII of France. Due to her marriage to John of Foix, she was Countess of Étampes and Viscountess of Narbonne.

Marie was the eldest daughter of Charles, Duke of Orléans, and his third wife Marie of Cleves. After a previous betrothal to Peter II, Duke of Bourbon, she married John of Foix on 8 September 1483.

Issue 
She had two children by John of Foix:

 Germaine of Foix (1488–1538)
 married Ferdinand II of Aragon, and whose relationship to the Navarrese throne was used as an excuse by Ferdinand to claim the throne of Navarre (see Spanish conquest of Iberian Navarre)
 Gaston of Foix (1489–1512)
 served as a general for his uncle Louis XII, killed at the battle of Ravenna in 1512.

Ancestors

References

1457 births
1493 deaths
15th-century French people
Marie
Marie
French princesses
Viscountesses of Narbonne
Countesses of Étampes